The Nigerian Red Cross Society (NRCS) was founded in 1960, and it has its headquarters in Abuja.

It has over 500,000 volunteers and 300 permanent employees. The Nigerian Red Cross Society was established by an Act of Parliament in 1960 and became the 86th Member – National Society of the League of Red Cross and Red Crescent Societies (Now International Federation of Red Cross and Red Crescent Societies) on 4 February 1961.

Its driving principles are humanity, impartiality, neutrality, independence, voluntary service, unity and universality.

NRC Anthem

References

External links
Nigerian Red Cross Society

Red Cross and Red Crescent national societies
1960 establishments in Nigeria
Organizations established in 1960
Medical and health organizations based in Nigeria